The 2013 Tetra Pak Tennis Cup was a professional tennis tournament played on clay courts. It was the third edition of the tournament which was part of the 2013 ATP Challenger Tour. It took place in Campinas, Brazil between 16 and 22 September 2013.

Singles main draw entrants

Seeds

 1 Rankings are as of September 9, 2013.

Other entrants
The following players received wildcards into the singles main draw:
  Rogério Dutra da Silva
  Fernando Romboli
  Ghilherme Scarpelli
  Caio Zampieri

The following players received entry from the qualifying draw:
  Mitchell Krueger
  Sergio Galdós
  Guillermo Durán
  Tiago Lopes

Champions

Singles

 Guilherme Clezar def.  Facundo Bagnis 6–4, 6–4

Doubles

 Guido Andreozzi /  Máximo González def.  Thiago Alves /  Thiago Monteiro 6–4, 6–4

External links
Official Website

 
Tetra Pak Tennis Cup